Three-time defending champion Diede de Groot defeated Yui Kamiji in the final, 6–3, 6–2 to win the women's singles wheelchair tennis title at the 2021 US Open. With the win, she completed the Golden Slam, becoming the first wheelchair tennis player to do so (alongside Dylan Alcott in the quad singles event).

Seeds

Draw

Finals

References

External links 
 Draw

Wheelchair Women's Singles
U.S. Open, 2021 Women's Singles